Shih Su-mei (born 20 July 1952) is a Taiwanese politician. She was the Minister of the Directorate General of Budget, Accounting and Statistics of the Executive Yuan from 2008 to 2016.

Education
Shih earned her bachelor's degree in business administration from National Taiwan University.

References

1952 births
Living people
Kuomintang politicians in Taiwan
National Taiwan University alumni
Women government ministers of Taiwan
21st-century Taiwanese women politicians
21st-century Taiwanese politicians
Government ministers of Taiwan
Politicians of the Republic of China on Taiwan from Taipei